Granastyochus trifasciatus is a species of longhorn beetles of the subfamily Lamiinae. It was described by Gilmour in 1959, and is known from Venezuela and eastern Ecuador.

References

Beetles described in 1959
Acanthocinini